Facundo Emanuel Rizzi (born 28 August 1997) is an Argentine professional footballer who plays as a left-back for Romanian Liga I club FC Argeș Pitești.

Career
Rizzi is a graduate of the Rosario Central youth system, being promoted to the first-team during the 2016–17 Primera División season. He featured in back-to-back league fixtures in December 2016, making his professional debut on 11 December in a home defeat to Lanús; with the secondary appearance coming against Belgrano seven days later. In July 2019, after a total of ten matches for Rosario, Rizzi departed to Primera B Nacional with Villa Dálmine.

On 11 January 2022, Rizzi joined Gimnasia Jujuy. 

In January 2023, Rizzi joined Liga I club FC Argeș Pitești on an eighteen-month contract.

Career statistics
.

References

External links

1997 births
Living people
People from Rosario Department
Argentine people of Italian descent
Argentine footballers
Association football defenders
Argentine Primera División players
Primera Nacional players
Rosario Central footballers
Villa Dálmine footballers
Gimnasia y Esgrima de Jujuy footballers
Liga I players
FC Argeș Pitești players
Sportspeople from Santa Fe Province
Argentine expatriate footballers
Expatriate footballers in Romania
Argentine expatriate sportspeople in Romania